Kentro is a village and a community of the Ilida municipality. Before the 2011 local government reform it was a part of the municipality of Amaliada, of which it was a municipal district.

Geography
It is situated on the west shore of the dam Pineios. The reservoir was created in the 1960s. Kentro is 2 km northwest of Agios Ilias, 3 km east of Agios Dimitrios, 3 km south of Borsi and 14 km northeast of Amaliada. The community of Kentro covers an area of 3.65 km2.

Historical population
According to the 2011 census, the population of Itea was 462 people, a decrease of almost 4% compared to the previous census of 2001.

See also

List of settlements in Elis

References

Populated places in Elis